Nandkumar Singh Chauhan (8 September 1952 – 2 March 2021) was a politician from the Indian state of Madhya Pradesh, belonging to Bharatiya Janata Party. He was a member of Lok Sabha from Khandwa at the time of his death.

Biography
His first major foray in politics was from the now-defunct Shahpur Vidhan Sabha constituency, once a segment of Khandwa Lok Sabha seat. He first contested Madhya Pradesh Vidhan Sabha election from Shahpur in 1980, as a candidate of BJP, but lost that time. He was first elected to Madhya Pradesh Vidhan Sabha from Shahpur in 1985, and was re-elected in 1990 and 1993. He vacated the assembly seat when he was elected to Lok Sabha in 1996 from Khandwa (Lok Sabha constituency). He was elected to Lok Sabha six times from Khandwa, in 1996, 1998, 1999, 2004, 2014 (16th Lok Sabha) and 2019, losing only in 2009.

Nandkumar Chauhan, sometimes spelled 'Chouhan', was BJP state president of Madhya Pradesh up to 18 April 2018 when he was replaced by Jabalpur MP Rakesh Singh.

Nand Kumar Chauhan died from complications from COVID-19 during the COVID-19 pandemic in India at Medanta Hospital in Gurgaon on 2 March 2021, at age 68.

References

|-

|-

External links
 Members of Fourteenth Lok Sabha - Parliament of India website

1952 births
2021 deaths
India MPs 1996–1997
India MPs 1998–1999
India MPs 1999–2004
India MPs 2004–2009
India MPs 2014–2019
Bharatiya Janata Party politicians from Madhya Pradesh
Lok Sabha members from Madhya Pradesh
People from Burhanpur
People from Khandwa district
Deaths from the COVID-19 pandemic in India
India MPs 2019–present